Big in Japan is an expression that can be used to describe Western (especially North American or European) musical groups who achieve success in Japan but not necessarily in other parts of the world.  However, the expression is commonly used ironically to mean successful in a limited, potentially comical, oddly specific, or possibly unverifiable way.

Original usage
The phrase began to appear in several major Japanese foreign-rock magazines, especially Music Life magazine, in the late 1970s, and in most cases, the "big in Japan" artists became popular in Japan due to being featured by Music Life. The concept predated the phrase; Neil Sedaka made it big in Japan with "One Way Ticket" before breaking through in his native United States. Sedaka noted that Elvis Presley, the biggest rock star in America in the late 1950s, never left North America/Hawaii (in part because his agent Colonel Tom Parker was an illegal immigrant), and this opened opportunities in foreign markets such as Japan for more obscure artists such as Sedaka to gain a foothold there. Jimmy Osmond, typically a side show to his older brothers The Osmonds in North America and Europe, cut several tracks in Japanese and received several gold records for his recordings. The Human Beinz, one-hit wonders in their native United States, scored two number one hit singles in Japan. In the summer of 1977, The Runaways, who struggled to make a mark in America, were the fourth most popular imported musical act in Japan, just behind The Beatles and Led Zeppelin. 

Irish musical group The Nolans, who were virtually unknown in North America, sold over 12 million records in Japan, outselling The Beatles, Michael Jackson, Adele, and Ed Sheeran combined. They also became the first international act to have all of their releases hit No. 1 in the country, as well as the first to hit No. 1 on both the Japanese domestic and international charts.

American singer-songwriter Billie Hughes recorded the 1991 song "Welcome to the Edge" for the soap opera Santa Barbara, but in Japan, the single became a No. 1 hit, selling over 500,000 copies and receiving Quadruple Platinum certification by the RIAJ.

In the late 20th century, notable "big in Japan" artists included several stadium rock bands from the United States, metal artists from Northern European countries such as Norway, Denmark, and especially Sweden and Finland (e.g. the rock band Hanoi Rocks), eurobeat artists from Austria, Germany and especially Italy, and UK rock artists.

Some bands have used their popularity in Japan as a springboard to break into other markets. Notably, the power pop group Cheap Trick, which had been known as the "American Beatles" in Japan for their appeal, achieved widespread success with their multi-platinum live album Cheap Trick at Budokan. The band had previously struggled to break into the mainstream American market with their earlier albums. Furthermore, like Cheap Trick, some bands have lost their "big in Japan" reputations after gaining popularity in their respective homelands. The most notable example is Bon Jovi.

For example, Scorpions initially had only limited success in Europe and the United States, yet were "Big in Japan", as evidenced by their 1978 tour of the country and the double live album Tokyo Tapes. Another example is The Ventures, a band formed in 1959 and touring Japan each year since 1965, having logged over 2,000 concerts there by 2006. "Being 'Big in Japan' turned into a positive sign of their closeness to the hearts of Japanese people, with the band embedded in national and local rock cultures."

Swedish band The Spotnicks toured Japan in 1966 after their song "Karelia" topped the Japanese charts the year prior, with hardly any promotion by the band. Around this time, the band's popularity in Europe had been waning due to changing musical tastes, particularly in their home country where they had relatively few hits, none of them topping the charts. They went on a few more tours there in the late '60s and occasionally toured there in the '70s, '80s and for the last time in 1998. While their popularity in Japan is small compared to The Ventures, "Karelia" is considered a classic song.

The phrase was used as the name of a UK punk band active from 1977 to 1982 (whose name inspired the title of a 1984 hit single by new wave band Alphaville) and was the name of the lead track on the Grammy-winning 1999 album Mule Variations by Tom Waits. The mockumentary This is Spinal Tap parodies this phenomenon when the band schedules a Japanese tour after discovering that their single "Sex Farm" is inexplicably selling very well there.

American band Mountain reformed for a successful tour of Japan in 1973. A live album titled Twin Peaks was released in 1974. Mountain bass player and vocalist Felix Pappalardi then worked with the Japanese band Creation in 1976.

After leaving Megadeth, guitarist Marty Friedman moved to Japan in 2003. There, he became a household name, with more than 600 TV appearances in 11 years and becoming a highly sought-after live and studio guitarist.

Other usages
"Big in Japan" has also been used in sports, for instance, to describe Major League Baseball players who join Japanese clubs at the end of their careers, such as Daryl Spencer. Professional wrestler Stan Hansen, who had a modest career in North America, became one of the nation’s most notorious gaijins in the Japanese professional wrestling scene, having become the first foreigner to defeat Antonio Inoki and Giant Baba.

"Small in Japan"
The derivative phrase "small in Japan", originally used for AC/DC, has been used since the early 1980s. In general, a small-in-Japan artist holds significant popularity in the Western world (in most cases the United States), and visits Japan many times for self-promotion, yet is almost unknown and unsuccessful in Japan despite being heavily featured by Japanese music media. An example of an internationally famous artist who is not well known in Japan is Adele.

In Japanese culture, the phrase "small in Japan" is also used to describe Japanese celebrities who are unknown, unsuccessful or "forgotten" in Japan but making their ways outside Japan. The phrase has been used to refer to musicians such as Dir En Grey, fashion models such as Ai Tominaga and Tao Okamoto, and Miss Universe contestants from Japan, most of whom are former unsuccessful fashion models, including Kurara Chibana and Riyo Mori.

In one exceptional case, Digital Arts magazine has used the phrase to describe the Xbox, a video game console that was a success all over the world except in Japan.

See also
 Exceptionalism
 Galápagos syndrome
 Occidentalism
 Pizza effect
 World famous in New Zealand

Notes

References

External links 
Not-so-Big in Japan: Western Pop Music in the Japanese Market — Popular Music; Vol. 14, No. 2 (May, 1995), pp. 203-225, Cambridge University Press

Music industry
Japanese culture
English phrases